Manius Acilius Glabrio was a Roman general and consul in 191 BC.

Career 

Glabrio was a plebeian and the first of his family to ascend to the consulship, making him a novus homo. Prior to his consulship, he was tribune of the plebs in 201, plebeian aedile in 197, and praetor peregrinus in 196 BC. During his praetorship, he suppressed a slave revolt in Etruria. He was elected consul for 191 BC with Publius Cornelius Scipio Nasica. That year, Glabrio was assigned to the Aetolian War against Antiochus and the Aetolian League and may have brought legislation – the lex Acilia – which placed insertion of intercalary months in the Roman calendar into the jurisdiction of the pontiffs.

As consul, Glabrio defeated the Seleucid ruler Antiochus the Great at the Battle of Thermopylae, and compelled him to withdraw from Greece. He then turned his attention to the Aetolian League, who had persuaded Antiochus to declare war against Rome. He captured Heraclea by early summer that year and, after unsuccessful peace negotiations, besieged Naupactus. 

Glabrio is depicted – probably by Polybius –  as having dealt moderately, showing leniency and self-restraint, with the Greeks during and after the war. In September 191 BC, the ex-consul Titus Quinctius Flamininus and victor of the Second Macedonian war brought news of an Aetolian request for a truce so that embassies to could be sent to Rome for peace terms; Glabrio accepted it, giving up the siege, and sent envoys to Rome. He was prorogued as proconsul into 190 BC. That year, he is recorded as having given gifts to Delphic oracle. He returned to Rome, celebrated a triumph, and built a temple.

In 189 BC, Glabrio was a candidate for the censorship, but was accused by the tribunes of having concealed a portion of the Syrian spoils in his own house; one of his legates gave evidence against him, and he withdrew his candidature. Glabrio was the first Roman to introduce the practice of overlaying statues with gold, a practice he initiated after having defeated Antiochus.

Family 

He was the father of a homonymous son who was elected as consul suffectus in 154 BC.

References
 Citations

 Sources

External links 
 

3rd-century BC Romans
2nd-century BC Roman consuls
2nd-century BC Roman generals
2nd-century BC Roman praetors
Glabrio, Manius consul 563 AUC
Plebeian aediles
Tribunes of the plebs